The Davis County Community School District is a rural public school district headquartered in Bloomfield, Iowa.

The district covers most of Davis County, with a small area in Van Buren County.  It serves the city of Bloomfield, the towns of Drakesville, Floris, and the surrounding rural areas.

The school's athletic teams are the Mustangs, and their colors are maroon and gold.

Dan Maeder has been the superintendent since 2012.

Schools
The district operates three schools, all in Bloomfield:
 Davis County Community Elementary School
 Davis County Community Middle School
 Davis County Community High School

Davis County Community High School

Athletics
The Mustangs participate in the South Central Conference in the following sports.
Football
Cross Country
Volleyball
Basketball
Wrestling
Golf
Tennis
Track and Field
 Boys' 2-time State Champions (1980, 1981)
 Girls' 1995 Class 2A State Champions (as Davis County-Fox Valley)
Baseball
 2011 Class 2A State Champions
Softball

See also
List of school districts in Iowa
List of high schools in Iowa

References

External links
 Davis County Community School District

School districts in Iowa
Education in Davis County, Iowa
Education in Van Buren County, Iowa